The Gállego is a river in Aragon, Spain, one of the main tributaries of the Ebro River.

It then flows in the Tena Valley through the municipalities of Sallent de Gállego, Panticosa and Biescas. Starting from Sabiñánigo it forms a wide elbow until Triste, from which it continues in its primitive north–south direction until flowing into the Ebro near Zaragoza.

The main tributaries of the Gállego in its upper basin are the Aguas Limpias, Caldarés, Escarra, Lana Mayor and  Aurín. In the medium and lower basin, they include Guarga, Seco, Asabón and Sotón.

The river's waters are subject to extensive regulation and derivation during its course, thus when it flows into the Ebro its discharge is just some 10 percent of its natural discharge.

This river gives its name to the Alto Gállego comarca of Aragon.

See also 
 List of rivers of Spain

References

External links

Comarca Alto Gállego
Rafting on the Gállego

Rivers of Spain
Rivers of Aragon